Hector Begeo (born June 19, 1964) is a three-time Olympian representing the Philippines. He is the national record holder in the men's 3000 metres steeplechase. He also place second in the 1983 Asian Athletics Championships and third in the steeplechase at the 1982 Asian Games. He is the only Filipino to advance into a semi-final in the 3000 m Steeplechase in an Olympic event during the 1988 Seoul Olympics. He also represented the Philippines at the 1997 World Championships in Athletics.

References

1964 births
Living people
Filipino male long-distance runners
Filipino male steeplechase runners
Olympic track and field athletes of the Philippines
Athletes (track and field) at the 1984 Summer Olympics
Athletes (track and field) at the 1988 Summer Olympics
Athletes (track and field) at the 1992 Summer Olympics
Asian Games medalists in athletics (track and field)
Athletes (track and field) at the 1982 Asian Games
World Athletics Championships athletes for the Philippines
Asian Games bronze medalists for the Philippines
Southeast Asian Games medalists in athletics
Southeast Asian Games gold medalists for the Philippines
Southeast Asian Games competitors for the Philippines
Southeast Asian Games silver medalists for the Philippines
Medalists at the 1982 Asian Games
Competitors at the 1985 Southeast Asian Games